A list of the abbots of the abbey of Peterborough, known until the late 10th century as "Medeshamstede".

Abbots

Sources
'Houses of Benedictine monks: The abbey of Peterborough', A History of the County of Northampton: Volume 2 (1906), pp. 83–95. http://www.british-history.ac.uk/report.asp?compid=40221. Date accessed: 29 May 2007.
Peterborough Chronicle.
Stenton, F.M., "Medeshamstede and its Colonies", in Stenton, D.M. (ed.), Preparatory to 'Anglo-Saxon England'being the collected Papers of Frank Merry Stenton, OUP, 1970.

Peterborough
 
Abbot of Peterborough